The 1995 Vuelta a Andalucía was the 41st edition of the Vuelta a Andalucía cycle race and was held from 13 February to 17 February 1995. The race started in Seville and finished in Granada. The race was won by Stefano Della Santa.

General classification

References

Vuelta a Andalucia
Vuelta a Andalucía by year
1995 in Spanish sport